or  is a village in Alta Municipality in Troms og Finnmark county, Norway. The name comes from the Sami place name  which means a clay seabed. Rafsbotn has a ski slope and Rafsbotn Chapel.

References

Villages in Finnmark
Alta, Norway
Populated places of Arctic Norway